Charles Martin Wilson (18 August 1935 – 31 August 2022) was a Scottish journalist and newspaper executive.

Early life and education
Charles Martin Wilson was born in Glasgow on 18 August 1935, and educated at Eastbank Academy in the east end of the city.

Career
Having begun his career as a reporter for the News Chronicle and the Daily Mail, Wilson subsequently edited the Glasgow Evening Times, The Glasgow Herald and The Scottish Sunday Standard from 1976 to 1982, before moving to London to work as deputy editor (1982–1985) and editor (1985–1990) of The Times. From 1992 to 1998 he was managing director of Mirror Group plc (having been editorial director of the Group from 1991 to 1992). He was concurrently managing director and editor-in-chief of The Sporting Life (1990–1998), and also edited The Independent for a brief spell (1995–1996).

Once a Royal Marines boxing champion, he was feared but respected by many of those who worked for him, among them Matthew Parris, who cites him as an inspiration.

Other activities
Wilson was appointed new Chairman of the Judges at British Press Awards 2006, as part of an effort to promote transparency and fairness in the judging process.

Wilson was the senior non-executive director of Chelsea and Westminster Hospital NHS Foundation Trust, where he made significant steps in assuring corporate governance.

Personal life and death
Wilson was married to the broadcaster and journalist Anne Robinson and they had a daughter, Emma. He was later married to the journalist Sally O'Sullivan with whom he had a son, Luke, and a daughter, Lily. They divorced in 2001, and later that year, he married amateur jockey Hon Rachel Pitkeathley, daughter of life peer Baroness Pitkeathley.

Wilson died from blood cancer at The London Clinic on 31 August 2022, at the age of 87.

References

1935 births
2022 deaths
20th-century British journalists
20th-century Royal Marines personnel
20th-century Scottish businesspeople
Deaths from blood cancer
Deaths from cancer in England
Journalists from Glasgow
People educated at Eastbank Academy
Scottish journalists
Scottish newspaper editors
The Independent editors
The Times people